Toxiclionella tumida is a species of sea snail, a marine gastropod mollusk in the family Clavatulidae.

Description
The shell grows to a length of 60 mm. The thick shell is subfusiform. The ground color of the shell is light green, with a reddish tone between the arcuate, opisthocline ribs and with a thick, olive-brown periostracum. The acuminate, orthoconic spire ends abruptly in a large blunt protoconch. The whorls are slightly convex. The outer lip shows a thick callus and parietal tubercle. The anal sinus in this species is very wide and rather shallow. The pear-shaped aperture is relatively large. The broad siphonal canal is unnotched and of moderate length. The subsutural cord is strong and more tumid than in Toxiclionella haliplex.

Distribution
This marine species occurs along the Agulhas Bank, South Africa.

References

 Kilburn, R.N. (1985). Turridae (Mollusca: Gastropoda) of southern Africa and Mozambique. Part 2. Subfamily Clavatulinae. Ann. Natal Mus. 26(2), 417-470

External links
 

Endemic fauna of South Africa
tumida
Gastropods described in 1870